Lori Ann Palmeri ( Clarke; born May 25, 1967) is an American urban planner, community organizer, and Democratic politician.  She is the 49th mayor of Oshkosh, Wisconsin, and a member of the Wisconsin State Assembly, representing Wisconsin's 54th Assembly district since January 2023.

She was also previously known as Lori A. Hoover and Lori A. McCord.

Biography
Lori Palmeri was born Lori Ann Clarke.  She had an extremely difficult childhood, and suffered abuse and homelessness before being placed in the foster care system.  She became pregnant at age 15, dropped out of school and got married.  She left her first husband and moved for some time to Indianapolis, Indiana, and was involved in litigation several times with her estranged husband over child support.  She completed the G.E.D. in the 1990s, and worked as a contract paralegal.  She soon returned to Wisconsin, where she worked in an IT job for ProVantage Health Services, and then moved to Kimberly, Wisconsin, where she worked for the Kimberly Clark Corporation.

She took college courses at the University of Wisconsin–Oshkosh, Fox Cities Campus, and ultimately moved to Oshkosh, Wisconsin, in 2008.  In Oshkosh, she studied urban planning at the University of Wisconsin–Oshkosh and worked as an intern for the East Central Wisconsin Regional Planning Commission.  She earned her bachelor's degree in 2010, and went on to obtain her master's in urban planning from the University of Wisconsin–Milwaukee in 2013.

She worked a number of jobs in the city of Oshkosh, and started her own consulting firm in 2015.

Political career
In Spring 2016, she was elected to the Oshkosh Common Council in an at-large seat.  In 2019, she challenged incumbent mayor Steve Cummings and prevailed with 51.4% of the vote.  She went on to win re-election in 2021, defeating Kris Larson.

In March 2022, Oshkosh's state representative Gordon Hintz announced he would retire after eight terms in the Assembly.  Prior to making his announcement, however, he called Palmeri to inform her of his decision and asked her to run for his seat.  Palmeri took up the challenge and entered the race.  She did not face an opponent in the Democratic primary, but during the campaign news broke about her difficult upbringing and personal and legal difficulties, resulting in her addressing that period of her life for the first time in an interview with WHBY radio.  She went on to win the general election with 54% of the vote, defeating Republican Donnie Herman.

She will be sworn into the Assembly in January 2023.  She has said she will not resign as mayor, but has not said if she will run for another term as mayor in 2023.

Personal life and family
Lori Clarke took the last name McCord when she married Jeffrey McCord.  They had a troubled marriage and divorced, but continued to fight over child support payments for several years.  Lori subsequently changed her name to Lori Hoover.  She was then involved in another abusive relationship before obtaining a restraining order, in 2003, against Barney Lynch.  

Lori is now married to Anthony "Tony" Palmeri.  Palmeri is a professor at the University of Wisconsin–Oshkosh, and served several years on the Oshkosh common council.  Lori has two adult children from earlier relationships and two grandchildren.

Electoral history

Oshkosh Mayor (2019, 2021)

| colspan="6" style="text-align:center;background-color: #e9e9e9;"| General Election, April 2, 2019

| colspan="6" style="text-align:center;background-color: #e9e9e9;"| Nonpartisan Primary, February 16, 2021 (top two)

| colspan="6" style="text-align:center;background-color: #e9e9e9;"| General Election, April 6, 2021

Wisconsin Assembly (2022)

| colspan="6" style="text-align:center;background-color: #e9e9e9;"| General Election, November 8, 2022

References

External links
 Campaign website
 Official (city) website
 
 Lori Palmeri at Wisconsin Vote

1967 births
Living people
Democratic Party members of the Wisconsin State Assembly 
Women state legislators in Wisconsin 
Politicians from Oshkosh, Wisconsin
People from Shawano County, Wisconsin
21st-century American women politicians
Mayors of places in Wisconsin
University of Wisconsin–Oshkosh alumni
University of Wisconsin–Milwaukee alumni